There are at least 54 named trails in Missoula County, Montana according to the U.S. Geological Survey, Board of Geographic Names.  A trail is defined as: "Route for passage from one point to another; does not include roads or highways (jeep trail, path, ski trail)."

 Angle Face Ski Trail, el.  
 Big Sky Ski Trail, el.  
 Blue Mountain Equestrian and Hiking Trail, el.  
 Blue Mountain Nature Trail National Recreation Trail, el.  
 Bowl Outrun Ski Trail, el.  
 Carlton Lake Trail, el.  
 Centennial Trail Ski Trail, el.  
 Chicken Chute Ski Trail, el.  
 East Bowls Ski Trail, el.  
 Far East Ski Trail, el.  
 First Run Ski Trail, el.  
 Foothills Trail, el.  
 Foxtrot Ski Trail, el.  
 Grandstand Ski Trail, el.  
 Granite Ridge Trail, el.  
 Grizzly Chute Ski Trail, el.  
 Grizzly Ski Trail, el.  
 High Roller Ski Trail, el.  
 Holland Falls National Recreation Trail, el.  
 Houle Creek Trail, el.  
 Huckleberry Ski Trail, el.  
 Iris Point Trail, el.  
 Josephine Creek Trail, el.  
 Kennedy Creek Trail, el.  
 Lee Ridge Trail, el.  
 Levitation Ski Trail, el.  
 Longhorn Ski Trail, el.  
 Lower High Park Ski Trail, el.  
 Lower Hot Fudge Ski Trail, el.  
 Lower Paradise Ski Trail, el.  
 Lower Second Thought Ski Trail, el.  
 Lower Sunrise Bowl Ski Trail, el.  
 McCormick Creek Trail, el.  
 Mill Creek Trail (Montana), el.  
 Mission Magic Ski Trail, el.  
 Mogul Alley Ski Trail, el.  
 North Dakota Downhill Ski Trail, el.  
 Purgatory Ski Trail, el.  
 Sally Ridge Trail, el.  
 Second Thought Ski Trail, el.  
 Shining Peak Trail, el.  
 Sixmile Trail, el.  
 Spartan Headwall Ski Trail, el.  
 Tepee Ridge Trail, el.  
 Time Out Cat Walk Ski Trail, el.  
 Upper High Park Ski Trail, el.  
 Upper Hot Fudge Ski Trail, el.  
 Upper Paradise Ski Trail, el.  
 Upper Second Thought Ski Trail, el.  
 Upper Spartan Ski Trail, el.  
 Upper Sunrise Bowl Ski Trail, el.  
 West Bowls Ski Trail, el.  
 West Ridge Ski Trail, el.  
 Whipped Cream Ski Trail, el.

Further reading

See also
 List of trails of Montana
 Trails of Yellowstone National Park

Notes

Geography of Missoula County, Montana
 Missoula County
Transportation in Missoula County, Montana